The Antranik Youth Association (AYA), or simply Antranik, is a football club based in Antelias, Lebanon, that competes in the . The club was founded in 1931 as the football section of the Antranik Youth Association, the Lebanese chapter of the Armenian Youth Association.

History
With the establishment of Antranik Youth Association in 1931, Antranik formed its football team. The team, represented by Shavarsh Pakrian, participated in the Lebanese Football Association's first meeting on 22 March 1933, as one of its founding members. In 1940–41, Antranik's reserve team – Antranik B – won the Lebanese Second Division with 15 wins and one draw.

In the 2020–21 season, Antranik's football team finished second in the Lebanese Fourth Division Beirut group, qualifying for the general finals; they finished second in their group, and were promoted to the Lebanese Third Division.

Honours 
 Lebanese Second Division
 Winners (1): 1940–41

Notes

References

External links
 

Antranik Youth Association
1931 establishments in Lebanon
Association football clubs established in 1931
Football clubs in Lebanon
Armenian association football clubs outside Armenia
Armenian football clubs in Lebanon
Diaspora sports clubs
Sport in Beirut